Carson Branstine (born September 9, 2000) is a Canadian-American tennis player and model. She reached a career-high doubles ranking of world No. 203 on September 18, 2017 and a career-high ITF junior ranking of No. 4 on July 17, 2017. She won the 2017 Australian Open and French Open junior doubles titles with Bianca Andreescu. Branstine represented the United States from 2014 to February 2017, but has started representing Canada, the birth country of her mother, in March 2017.

Early life
Branstine was born in Irvine, California to an American father, Bruce, and a Canadian mother, Carol Freeman, from Toronto. She has two older sisters, Cassidy and Constance, both of whom play collegiate tennis. Her cousin Freddie Freeman is a professional baseball first baseman and MVP for the Los Angeles Dodgers of Major League Baseball (MLB). Carson began playing tennis at the age of 7. After spending a few years training at the USTA, Branstine accepted an offer from Tennis Canada to train at the National Training Centre in Montreal, starting in October 2016. Branstine quotes that her move to Tennis Canada was "the best decision I've ever made", and has continued to represent her mother's roots with pride. She began her modeling career in Montreal after being discovered walking on Saint Laurent Boulevard in Downtown Montreal.

Tennis career

2014–15
Branstine played her first junior tournament in November 2014 at the ITF G4 in Atlanta and won the doubles title. Two weeks later at the G4 in Boca Raton, she captured her first junior singles title and also won in doubles. In March 2015, she played her first professional tournament, losing to Karolína Stuchlá in the first round of the $10k in Gainesville, Florida. In June 2015, she won the doubles title at the G4 in Haverford, Pennsylvania. Branstine qualified for her first junior Grand Slam main draw at the US Open in September, but lost to Evgeniya Levashova in the opening round. She also reached the second round in doubles.

2016
In March, Branstine captured her second junior singles title with a victory over Ann Li at the G4 in Newport Beach, California. She won her third junior singles title in June at the ITF G4 in Plantation, Florida. In September, she reached the quarterfinals in singles of the junior US Open, upsetting the No. 2 seed Olesya Pervushina in the second round. In November, she advanced to the semifinals in doubles at the $50k Toronto Challenger with partner Elena Bovina. Also in November, she reached the doubles semifinals at the ITF GA in Mexico City. In December, Branstine made it to the semifinals in singles and to the quarterfinals in doubles at the Eddie Herr ITF G1 in Bradenton, Florida. The following week, she advanced to the semifinals of the GA Orange Bowl.

2017
In January at the  Australian Open, Branstine reached the third round in girls' singles and captured the doubles title with Bianca Andreescu. She started representing Canada officially in March and played her first tournament as a Canadian at the G1 in Carson, California at the end of the month, where she went on to win both the singles and doubles titles. In June at the junior event of the French Open, Branstine lost in the opening round in singles, but won her second straight major doubles title with Bianca Andreescu. In July at the G1 in Roehampton, she won the doubles title with Marta Kostyuk. At Wimbledon, she lost in the quarterfinals in singles and in the semifinals in doubles with Kostyuk, ending her hopes of winning a third straight junior doubles Grand Slam title. In August at the Rogers Cup, she was awarded a wildcard into the doubles main draw with compatriot Bianca Andreescu, her first WTA Tour main draw. They upset Kristina Mladenovic and Anastasia Pavlyuchenkova in the first round, before falling to the top seeds, Ekaterina Makarova and Elena Vesnina. At the junior US Open in September, Branstine was defeated in the second round in both singles and doubles. The following week at the Tournoi de Québec, she advanced with Andreescu to her first WTA Tour doubles final in which they were defeated by the top-seeded Tímea Babos and Andrea Hlaváčková.

College tennis
Branstine made the decision to accept a full scholarship at the University of Southern California in 2019, and transferred to the University of Virginia,3 after spending a redshirt season at USC. She did not play the tennis season at Southern California due to a meniscus surgery. Although she was the No. 2 freshman newcomer and held the No. 1 Universal Tennis Rating throughout her time off and into the start at UVA. Branstine is a media studies major, and also declared pre-law.

WTA career finals

Doubles: 1 (1 runner-up)

ITF Circuit finals

Singles: 4 (1 title, 3 runner–ups)

Doubles: 1 (1 title)

Junior Grand Slam finals

Doubles: 2 (2 titles)

Record against top-100 players
Branstine's win–loss record against players who were ranked world No. 100 or higher when played is as follows:
  Donna Vekić 0–1

References

External links
 
 

2000 births
Living people
American female tennis players
American people of Canadian descent
Canadian female tennis players
Canadian people of American descent
People from Orange, California
Sportspeople from Orange, California
Australian Open (tennis) junior champions
French Open junior champions
Grand Slam (tennis) champions in girls' doubles
Tennis people from California
Virginia Cavaliers women's tennis players